The Nielsen Pro Tennis Championship is a tennis tournament held intermittently in Winnetka, Illinois, USA since 1984. The event is part of the ATP Challenger Tour and is played on outdoor hard courts at the A. C. Nielsen Tennis Center, a facility owned and operated by the Winnetka Park District.

Past finals

Singles

Doubles

External links 
ITF search
Winnetka Park District

 
ATP Challenger Tour